Marinifilum breve is a Gram-negative, facultatively anaerobic, short-clavate and non-motile bacterium from the genus of Marinifilum which has been from the Yongle Blue Hole from the South China Sea.

References

Bacteria described in 2018
Bacteroidia